Thrapsano is a former municipality in the Heraklion regional unit, Crete, Greece. Since the 2011 local government reform it is part of the municipality Minoa Pediada, of which it is a municipal unit. Population 2,334 (2011).

Thrapsano village is located roughly 30 km. south-east of Heraklion and is at an altitude of 340m. It was a community until the 1998 "Kapodistria plan", when it became a municipal district of the municipality of Thrapsano.
The village is - at least on the island of Crete– well known and particularly to seniors because of the Ventema. 
Ventema was the summer campaign and temporary installation in the various places of Crete, with earth ideal for pottery, and much wood for the furnace, until mid-September, of Thrapsano potters, in teams, where they manufactured big jars called “pitharia” and other earthen vessels, because they are fragile and the transportation from the Thrapsano, to consumer's site is too risky with the transportation by donkeys and mules. A proverb says, "Everybody fears the God, and the Thrapsaniotis the walls."

Thrapsano is identified with pottery and particularly with the manufacture of “pitharia”, as its residents are considered descendants of the Minoan potters. Traditionally therefore the Thrapsano resident “Thrapsaniotis” is identified even today with the potter and in particular with the name of “pitharas”.

References

External links
Thrapsano through words and pictures.

Populated places in Heraklion (regional unit)